AIOC may refer to:
Associate of the Institute of Carpenters UK
Anglo-Iranian Oil Company
Azerbaijan International Operating Company
Australian Informatics Olympiad Committee
Act In Our Community
All In One Cable for Amateur Radio